The 2023 World Matchplay (known as the 2023 Betfred World Matchplay) will be the 30th annual staging of the World Matchplay, organised by the Professional Darts Corporation. The tournament will take place at the Winter Gardens, Blackpool, from 15 to 23 July 2023.

Michael van Gerwen is the defending champion after winning his third World Matchplay title, defeating Gerwyn Price 18–14 in the 2022 final.

The 2023 Women's World Matchplay will also take place during the event, being held on 23 July, hours before the main final.

Prize money
The prize fund is expected to remain £800,000, with £200,000 going to the winner.

Format
All games have to be won by two clear legs, with a game being extended if necessary for a maximum of six extra legs before a tie-break leg is required. For example, in a first to 10 legs first round match, if the score reaches 12–12 then the 25th leg will be the decider.

The first round is played first to 10 legs, second round first to 11 legs, quarter-finals first to 16 legs, semi-finals first to 17 legs and final first to 18 legs.

Qualification
The top 16 players on the PDC Order of Merit at the cut-off point on 11 July will be seeded for the tournament. The top 16 players on the ProTour Order of Merit, not to have already qualified on the cut-off date will be unseeded.

As of 5 March 2023, the following players will qualify for the tournament:

PDC Order of Merit

PDC ProTour Qualifiers

Draw

References

2023
2023 in English sport
2023 in darts
July 2023 sports events in the United Kingdom
Scheduled sports events